The Flying Dragons, also known as FDS, was a Chinese American street gang that was prominent in New York City's Chinatown from the 1970s to the early 1990s. Formed in 1967, by immigrants primarily from Hong Kong, they are affiliated with the Hip Sing Tong. Throughout the 1980s, the gang often engaged in bloody turf wars with the newer Ghost Shadows gang. Their activities have included extortion, kidnapping, murder, racketeering, and illegal gambling. The gang moved heavily into heroin trafficking after the Italian-American Mafia lost the trade as a result of the Pizza Connection prosecutions in the mid-1980s.

Characteristics
Similar to the Triads of China, and the Yakuza of Japan, the Flying Dragons are likely to operate with people of their own ethnicity. Unlike western gangs, gangs such as the Flying Dragons remain fairly unnoticeable by police outside of their own homelands. In the leader Johnny "Onionhead" Eng's criminal case, it is reported the Flying Dragons are a fairly violent gang, being involved in murders and drug trafficking.

Activities
The Flying Dragons are said to have operated heavily in Chinatowns in the United States and in Hong Kong. As many Asian gangs did, the Flying Dragons dealt with illegal drugs; mainly heroin. They are also known for extortion and kidnapping. Along with South America, Asia entered the market around the 1970s and have played a larger role in supplying drugs to American consumers. The steady demand for illegal drugs by U.S. consumers, which Asian gangs were a significant part of, has led the U.S. government to wage a war on drugs since the 1980s.

Gang leader Johnny Eng, otherwise known as "Onionhead", was brought up on charges of masterminding an international heroin importing scheme. Prosecutors in Brooklyn federal court say there is a mountain of evidence against him such as 300 pounds of heroin shipped to New York in stuffed animals, strapped to couriers, and sealed in steel machines used to wash bean sprouts.

Drug trafficking throughout Chinatown has been greatly reduced due to the discovery of the tunnels.

Gang leadership
While the Flying Dragons' current leadership is unknown, the most well-known boss in the history of gang was Johnny "Onionhead" Eng (aka Machinegun Johnny). His notable tenure as leader is estimated to have lasted from a rise to power in the early 1980s, to his incarceration in the 1990s.

Eng is widely believed to have first emigrated from Hong Kong to the United States in the early 1970s, aged around 13. Several sources agree that Eng took over the Flying Dragons in 1983, after the murder of his predecessor, Michael Chen, in the spring of that year. Nicknamed "The Scientist" for his cool and calm demeanor, Chen had been killed in the doorway of the Hip Sing credit union, suffering a total of 14 gunshots, including four rounds that were fired directly into his eyes.

Vietnamese Flying Dragons
The Vietnamese Flying Dragons were a former branch of the Flying Dragons gang that consisted of primarily Vietnamese members. One of its former members, David Thai, a Vietnamese refugee who had joined the gang in 1983, decided to leave the gang in 1987 after being disaffected by the lower status of the members that were consigned to this particular branch of the gang, who were mostly viewed as "coffee boys" and were ordered to carry out crimes that carried the stiffest penalties such as robbery and murder, and were cut off from the main gang's more lucrative activities such as drug dealing. David Thai would later go on to build his own gang that would rival the Flying Dragons, called Born to Kill, which began to compete with the Flying Dragons and the Ghost Shadows for control and territory over Chinatown.

Overseas activities
The Flying Dragons have many roots in Hong Kong. In 1994, in what law-enforcement officials called a major blow to the largest and last of the traditional criminal gangs in Chinatown, 33 suspected members of the Flying Dragons were indicted on federal racketeering charges. Sources described these charges as three murders, 12 attempted murders, heroin trafficking, illegal gambling, arson, extortion, and robberies that stretched from Manhattan into Brooklyn and Queens. They've also been said to be located in parts of Canada and Australia.

References

Sources

External links
 
 
 

Organizations established in 1967
1967 establishments in New York City
Organizations disestablished in 1994
1994 disestablishments in New York (state)
Chinese-American organized crime groups
Former gangs in New York City
Street gangs
Chinese-American culture in New York City
Overseas Chinese organisations
Chinatown, Manhattan
Triad groups